Lunaferamita is an extinct genus of cystoporate bryozoans of the family Constellariidae, known from the Middle Ordovician. It is distinct from other Constellariidae due to the presence of a lunarium, a quality distinctive to cystoporates. Like other Constellariidae, such as Constellaria, it has star-shaped monticules (bumps) on the surface of its colonies.

Species
The following species are recognized:

References

Cystoporida
Prehistoric bryozoan genera